The 1989 season in Swedish football, starting January 1989 and ending December 1989:

Honours

Official titles

Competitions

Promotions, relegations and qualifications

Promotions

Relegations

International qualifications

Domestic results

Allsvenskan 1989

Allsvenskan play-off 1989 
Semi-finals

Final

Division 1 Norra 1989

Division 1 Södra 1989

Svenska Cupen 1988–89 
Final

National team results

Notes

References 
Print

Online

 
Seasons in Swedish football